The 2014–15 season is the 113th season of competitive football in Hong Kong, starting in July 2014 and ending in June 2015.

Promotion and relegation

Pre-season

1 The Premier League replace First Division League as the top-tier league in the 2014–15 season.

Post-season

Representative team

Hong Kong national football team

2015 EAFF East Asian Cup Preliminary Round

The 2015 EAFF East Asian Cup preliminary round 2 was held in Taiwan between 13 and 19 November 2014. Hong Kong was drawn with Guam, North Korea and Chinese Taipei. The winner of the preliminary round qualifies for the final round.

2015 Guangdong–Hong Kong Cup

This is a tournament between two teams representing Hong Kong and Guangdong Province of China respectively. The first leg will take place in Huizhou, Guangdong, being held at Huizhou Olympic Stadium, and the second leg took place in Hong Kong, being held at Mong Kok Stadium.

2018 FIFA World Cup qualification

The draw for the group stage of second round qualification was held in Kuala Lumpur, Malaysia on 14 April 2015. Hong Kong was drawn with China PR, Qatar and Maldives and Bhutan in group C. Hong Kong has started their qualifying campaign in June 2015.

Friendly matches in first half season

Friendly matches in second half season

League season

Premier League

First Division League

Second Division League

Third Division League

Cup competitions

Community Cup

Senior Shield

FA Cup

League Cup

Season play-off

 
2014 in Hong Kong sport
2014 in association football
2015 in Hong Kong sport
2015 in association football
Seasons in Hong Kong football